The Social Democratic Party (JF) is a social-democratic political party on the Faroe Islands, led by Aksel V. Johannesen.

History
The Social Democratic Party was founded on 25 September 1925 by members of Faroese trade unions.

Its youth organization Sosialistiskt Ungmannafelag (Socialist Youth) was founded in 1965.

At the 2004 general election on 20 January 2004, the party received 21.8% of the popular vote and therefore won 7 out of 33 seats in the Løgting.

At the 2008 general election on 19 January 2008, the party received 19.3% of the popular vote and therefore won 6 out of 33 seats.

In the 2011 election for the Danish Folketing, the party improved its vote share to 21.0%, and took one of the two Faroese seats previously held by Republic. The elected representative of the Social Democratic Party in the Folketing is Sjúrður Skaale, who received 1539 personal votes.

At the 2011 general election on 29 October 2011, the party received 17.8% of the popular vote and therefore won 6 out of 33 seats.

At the 2015 general election on 1 September 2015, the party received 25.1% of the vote, winning a plurality of 8 seats in the Løgting.

Ideology
The party is officially neutral on the matter of independence from Denmark, but generally leans towards remaining in the union. In the Danish Folketing, the Social Democratic Party supports the "Red Bloc" led by the Social Democrats of Denmark.

Party leaders 
Aksel V. Johannesen 2011–present
Jóannes Eidesgaard 1996–2011
Marita Petersen 1993–1996
Atli Dam 1972–1993
Jákup Frederik Øregaard 1969–1972
Einar Waag 1968–1969
Peter Mohr Dam 1936–1968
Maurentius Viðstein 1926–1936

Current members of the Løgting 

As of the 2022 general snap election:

Election results 

a. The Social Democratic Party ran on a joint electoral coalition with the Self-Government Party in the 1946 general election (the former ended up winning 4 seats with the latter winning 2 seats).

References

External links
 Official web site 

Political parties in the Faroe Islands
Social democratic parties in Europe
Centre-left parties in Europe
Socialist parties in Denmark
Socialism in the Faroe Islands
Political parties established in 1925
1925 establishments in the Faroe Islands